Biomineralising polychaetes are polychaetes that biomineralize.

The most important biomineralizing polychaetes are serpulids, sabellids and cirratulids. They secrete tubes of calcium carbonate. Serpulids have most advanced biomineralization system among the annelids. Serpulids possess very diverse tube ultrastructures. Serpulid tubes are composed of aragonite, calcite or mixture of both polymorphs. In addition to the tubes, some serpulid species secrete calcareous opercula. Some sabellids and cirratulids can secrete aragonitic tubes. Sabellid and cirratulid tubes have a spherulitic prismatic ultrastructure. There are thin organic sheets in serpulid tube mineral structures. These sheets have evolved as an adaptation to strengthen the mechanical properties of the tubes.

References

Polychaetes
Serpulidae
Biomineralization